"High on a Happy Vibe" is a song by British band Urban Cookie Collective, released as the fourth single from their debut album by the same name (1994). Written and composed by Rohan Heath, the vocals were by Diane Charlemagne, who also provided the vocal for the band's three previous hit singles. The song peaked at number 18 in Scotland, number 24 in Belgium, number 27 in the Netherlands and number 30 in Ireland. In the UK, it peaked at number 31 on the UK Singles Chart, but was even more successful on the UK Dance Singles Chart, reaching number 12. Outside Europe, the song peaked at number 71 in Australia. The accompanying music video sees the band performing on a flying carpet.

Critical reception
Pan-European magazine Music & Media commented, "The dance craze started in the UK. Then the continentals took over with "Euro Dance". The Cookies are the British answer to the phenomenon, and taste like Swedish "kecks" and German "Kuchen"." James Hamilton from British magazine Music Weeks RM Dance Update described it as a "quovery chugging cheesy chanter".

Track listings
 12-inch single, UK (1994) "High on a Happy Vibe" (original 12-inch mix) – 5:52
 "High on a Happy Vibe" (Johnny L Sinus mix) – 6:23
 "High on a Happy Vibe" (Development Corporation mix) – 5:54
 "High on a Happy Vibe" (Overworld mix) – 6:38

 CD single, Europe (1994) "High on a Happy Vibe" (original 7-inch edit) – 3:35
 "High on a Happy Vibe" (original 12-inch mix) – 5:52

 CD maxi, Germany (1994)'
 "High on a Happy Vibe" (original 7-inch edit) – 3:35
 "High on a Happy Vibe" (original 12-inch mix) – 5:52
 "High on a Happy Vibe" (Johnny L Sinus mix) – 6:23
 "High on a Happy Vibe" (Development Corporation mix) – 5:54
 "High on a Happy Vibe" (Overworld mix) – 6:38
 "High on a Happy Vibe" (Johnny L Learner mix) – 5:36

Charts

References

1994 singles
1994 songs
Eurodance songs
Pulse 8 singles
Urban Cookie Collective songs